Vonne Chowning (born in 1943 in Long Beach, California) is a former American politician.  She served as a Democratic member of the Nevada Assembly from 1988 to 1990 and again from 1992 to 2004, representing Districts 19 and 28 (both covering the northeastern Las Vegas Valley).

Background
Chowning received her bachelor's degree in education from University of Nevada, Reno and worked as a foreign language teacher. She is fluent in Spanish. Later she became a realtor, a profession which she still practices, as well as a member of the Greater Las Vegas Board of Realtors.

Elections
1988 In the Democratic primary for Assembly District 19, Chowning defeated three other candidates (including her eventual successor in the seat, Pat Little) with 616 votes (43%).  She then defeated Republican Connie Glass with 2,721 votes (76%).
1990 Chowning and Little both ran again, and this time Chowning lost the primary with 532 votes (43%) to Little's 703 votes (57%)).
1992 After redistricting, much of Assembly District 19 was now in District 28.  Chowning ran in AD28 and won a close three-way primary against Harold Giron and Jose Solorio with 552 votes (35%). In the general election she won against Republican Michael Palmieri with 2,781 votes (72%).
1994 Chowning was unopposed in the primary.  In the general election she defeated Independent American Party candidate Dicksie Duke, winning 1,581 votes (78%).
1996 Chowning was unopposed in the primary.  In the general election she defeated Duke and Libertarian candidate Jim Burns, winning 1,536 votes (76%).
1998 Only two candidates filed for District 28, both Democrats. As a result, there was no primary and the two competed in the general election.  Chowning defeated Judi Lynn with 900 votes (60%).
2000 Chowning won the primary with 267 votes (58%) against Judi Lynn.  She then defeated Libertarian James Dan with 1,197 votes (55%) in the general election.
2002 After the 2000 Census, Assembly District 28 was redrawn to exclude Chowning's house.  However, she moved back into the district in order to run for re-election. She won the primary with 601 votes (53%) against Mo Denis, her eventual successor in the seat.  She then won a rematch with Dan with 2,216 votes (65%) in the general election.

References

1943 births
Living people
People from Long Beach, California
People from North Las Vegas, Nevada
University of Nevada, Reno alumni
Democratic Party members of the Nevada Assembly
Women state legislators in Nevada
20th-century American politicians
20th-century American women politicians
American real estate brokers
21st-century American politicians
21st-century American women politicians